Madonna with Child is a tempera painting by Italian Renaissance painter Sandro Botticelli, dating to c. 1467 and housed in the Musée du Petit Palais of Avignon, France.

Sources

1467 paintings
Child Avignon